The rhetorical situation is the circumstance of an event that consists of an issue, an audience, and a set of constraints. A rhetorical situation arises from a given context or exigence. An article by Lloyd Bitzer introduced the model of rhetorical situation in 1968, which was later challenged and modified by Richard E. Vatz (1973) and Scott Consigny (1974). More recent scholarship has further redefined the model to include more expansive views of rhetorical operations and ecologies.

Theoretical development 
In the twentieth century, three influential texts concerning the rhetorical situation were published: Lloyd Bitzer's "The Rhetorical Situation," Richard E. Vatz's "The Myth of the Rhetorical Situation," and Scott Consigny's "Rhetoric and Its Situations." Bitzer argues that a situation determines and brings about rhetoric; Vatz proposes that rhetoric creates "situations" by making issues salient; and Consigny explores the rhetor as an artist of rhetoric, creating salience through a knowledge of commonplaces.

Bitzer's definition 
Lloyd Bitzer began the conversation in his 1968 piece titled "The Rhetorical Situation." Bitzer wrote that rhetorical discourse is called into existence by situation. He defined the rhetorical situation as "a complex of persons, events, objects, and relations presenting an actual or potential exigence which can be completely or partially removed if discourse, introduced into the situation, can so constrain human decision or action as to bring about the significant modification of the exigence." With any rhetorical discourse, a prior rhetorical situation exists. The rhetorical situation dictates the significant physical and verbal responses as well as the sorts of observations to be made. An example of this would be an activist speaking out on climate change as an apparent global problem. The situation, thus, calls for the activist to use and respond with rhetorical discourse on the climate change issue. In other words, rhetorical meaning is brought about by events. Bitzer especially focuses on the sense of timing (kairos) needed to speak about a situation in a way that can best remedy the exigence.

Three constituent parts make up any rhetorical situation.

 The first constituent part is the exigence, or a problem existing in the world. Exigence is rhetorical when it can be affected and changed by human interaction, and when it is capable of positive modification through the act of persuasion. A rhetorical exigence may be strong, unique, or important, or it may be weak, common, or trivial.
 The second constituent part is audience. Rhetorical discourse promotes change through influencing an audience's decision and actions.
 The third constituent part is the set of constraints. Constraints may be the persons, events, objects, and relations that limit decisions and action. Theorists influenced by Marx would additionally discuss ideological constraints, which produce unconscious limitations for subjects in society, including the social constraints of gender, class, and race. The speaker brings about a new set of constraints through the image of his or her personal character (ethos), logical proofs (logos), and use of emotion (pathos).

Critical responses

Vatz's challenge
An important critique of Bitzer's theory came in 1973 from Richard E. Vatz. Vatz believes that rhetoric defines a situation, because the context and choices of events could be forever described, but the persuader or influencer or rhetor must select which events to make part of the agenda. Choosing certain events and not others, and deciding their relative value or importance, creates a certain presence, or salience. Vatz quotes Chaïm Perelman: "By the very fact of selecting certain elements and presenting them to the audience, their importance and pertinency to the discussion are implied. Indeed such a choice endows these elements with a presence…" 

In essence, Vatz claims that the definitive elements of rhetorical efforts are the struggle to create for a chosen audience saliences or agendas, and this creation is then followed by the struggle to infuse the selected situation or facts with meaning or significance. What are we persuaded to talk about? What are we persuaded it means or signifies? These questions are the relevant ones to understand persuasion, not - What does the situation make us talk about? or, What does it intrinsically mean? Situations that do not physically make us attend to them are avoided and reflect the significance of subjectivity in framing socio-political realities. Vatz believes that situations are created, for example, when an activist sets an agenda to focus on climate change, thus creating a "rhetorical situation" (a situation determined by rhetoric). The activist (rhetor) enjoys more agency because s/he is not "controlled" by a situation, but creates the situation by making it salient in language. Vatz emphasizes the social construction of the situation as opposed to Bitzer's realism or objectivism.

While the two opinions have been widely recognized, Vatz has acknowledged that his piece is less recognized than Bitzer's. Vatz admits, while claiming that audience acceptance is not dispositive for measuring validity or predictive for future audience acceptance, that "more articles and professionals in our field cite his situational perspective than my rhetorical perspective." Bitzer's objectivism is clear, and easily taught as a method, despite Vatz's criticism. Vatz claims that portraying rhetoric as situation-based vitiates rhetoric as an important field, while portraying rhetoric as the cause of what people see as pressing situations enhances its significance as a field of study.

Consigny's challenge
Another response to Bitzer and Vatz came from Scott Consigny. Consigny believes that Bitzer's theory gives a rhetorical situation proper particularities, but "misconstrues the situation as being thereby determinate and determining," and that Vatz's theory gives the rhetor a correct character but does not correctly account for limits of a rhetor's ability.

Instead, he proposes the idea of rhetoric as an art. Consigny argues that rhetoric gives the means by which a rhetor can engage with a situation by meeting two conditions.

 The first condition is integrity. Consigny argues that the rhetor must possess multiple opinions with the ability to solve problems through those opinions.
 The second condition is receptivity. Consigny argues that the rhetor cannot create problems at will, but becomes engaged with particular situations.

Consigny finds that rhetoric which meets the two conditions should be interpreted as an art of topics or commonplaces. Taking after classical rhetoricians, he explains the topic as an instrument and a situation for the rhetor, allowing the rhetor to engage creatively with the situation. As a challenge to both Bitzer and Vatz, Consigny claims that Bitzer has a one-dimensional theory by dismissing the notion of topic as instrument, and that Vatz wrongly allows the rhetor to create problems willfully while ignoring the topic as situation. The intersection of topic as instrument and topic as realm gives the situation both meaning (as a perceptive formal device) and context (as material significance). Consigny concludes:The real question in rhetorical theory is not whether the situation or the rhetor is "dominant," but the extent, in each case, to which the rhetor can discover and control indeterminate matter, using his art of topics to make sense of what would otherwise remain simply absurd.

Other critical responses

Flower and Hayes 
In their 1980 article, "The Cognition of Discovery: Defining a Rhetorical Problem," Linda Flower and John R. Hayes expand upon Bitzer's definition of the rhetorical situation. In studying the cognitive processes that induce discovery, Flower and Hayes propose the model of the rhetorical problem. The rhetorical problem consists of two elements: the rhetorical situation (exigence and audience), and the writer's goals involving the reader, persona, meaning, and text. The rhetorical problem model explains how a writer responds to and negotiates a rhetorical situation while addressing and representing his or her goals for a given text.

Garret and Xiao 
In their 1993 article, Mary Garrett and Xiaosui Xiao apply Bitzer's rhetorical situation model to the response of the Chinese public to the Opium Wars of the 19th century. Garrett and Xiao propose three major changes to the existing theory of the rhetorical situation:

 Elevating the audience as a defining factor of rhetorical situation, rather than the speaker, because of its role in deciding exigency, kairos ("fittingness"), and constraints.
 Recognizing the power of discourse traditions within a given culture to influence the audience's perceptions, exigency, kairos, and constraints.
 Emphasizing the interactive and dialectical nature of the rhetorical situation.

Recent theories

Edbauer 
In a 2005 article, "Unframing Models of Public Distribution: From Rhetorical Situation to Rhetorical Ecologies," Jenny Edbauer argued for an understanding of the rhetorical situation beyond the three traditional elements of audience, exigence, and constraints. Edbauer argues that the rhetorical situation lies within larger networks of meaning, or "ecologies." A shift from "rhetorical situations" to "rhetorical ecologies" takes into account the complex, overlapping, and constantly shifting nature of audience, exigence, and constraints, as well as the distribution of public rhetorics. Edbauer argues that viewing rhetorical situations as ecologies shows us that "public rhetorics do not only exist in the elements of their situations, but also in the radius of their neighboring events."

Gallagher 
John R. Gallagher's 2015 article, "The Rhetorical Template," addresses the rhetorical situation in relation to "Web 2.0" and the templates of social networking sites, such as Facebook. Gallagher defines these Web 2.0 templates as "prefabricated designs that allow writers to create a coherent text." Gallagher contends that rhetorical templates offer a new approach to making meaning within new exigency. Rhetorical templates function within constraints of the genre, but also affect the exigence and purpose by creating how the text is written and read.

References

Rhetoric
Writing